The 2015–16 Star Hotshots season was the 28th season of the franchise in the Philippine Basketball Association (PBA).

Key dates
 July 20: Assistant coach Jason Webb was promoted as the head coach of the Star Hotshots.
August 23: The 2015 PBA draft took place in Midtown Atrium, Robinson Place Manila.

Draft picks

Roster

Philippine Cup

Eliminations

Standings

Game log

Playoffs

Bracket

Commissioner's Cup

Eliminations

Standings

Game log

Playoffs

Bracket

Governors' Cup

Eliminations

Standings

Transactions

Trades
Off-season

Governor's Cup

Recruited imports

References

Magnolia Hotshots seasons
Star